Ahmed Shah (born 3 February 1995) is an Indian cricketer. He made his first-class debut for Manipur in the 2018–19 Ranji Trophy on 30 December 2018. He made his Twenty20 debut for Manipur in the 2018–19 Syed Mushtaq Ali Trophy on 21 February 2019. He made his List A debut on 28 September 2019, for Manipur in the 2019–20 Vijay Hazare Trophy.

References

External links
 

1995 births
Living people
Indian cricketers
Manipur cricketers
Place of birth missing (living people)